Knutsen OAS Shipping is a privately owned shipping company located in Haugesund, Norway. The company has a fleet of purpose-built shuttle tankers, chemical carriers and product tankers internationally. The fleet consists of 41 shuttle tankers, chemical carriers and product tankers. In 2009 the company had an onshore staff of 64 to handle projects and operation of the fleet, 430 administrative employees offshore and about 800 foreign employees.

Structure

History 
Knutsen OAS Shipping AS was established in 1895 by Ole Andreas Knutsen. From 1900 to 1946 his son Knut Knutsen established the company as one of the largest shipping companies in Norway. In the 1970s the shuttle-tanker crises created economic difficulties for the company, and it had to restructure. In 1980 Jens Ulltveit Moe became the CEO of the company, and it became a part of the Umoe AS company.  After acquiring the assets owned by Jens Ulltveit Moe in 2008, the company's new CEO in 2009 was Trygve Seglem. Its present strategy was implemented in 1984, and based on long-term contracts to first class charters. In 1984, the company got its first offshore loading contract with Statoil for two shuttle tankers. The two new-built ships Anna Knutsen and Ragnhild Knutsen were built in China and delivered in 1987. One common feature or these two pioneer ships and all other shuttle tankers owned by Knutsen OAS is dynamic position systems from the Kongsberg Group. Knutsen OAS operates one of the largest fleets of purpose-built DP-class shuttle tankers in the world. In 2008, the company was listed with 40 ships and 11 ships under construction.

The fleet (per 2009)

Gas tankers

Offshore

Tank

Innovation & technology focus

The Knutsen OAS tanker segment is within the following areas:

• Offshore loading and crude oil transport 
• Products 
• Chemicals
• Liquefied natural gas (LNG)

Knutsen OAS has since the mid-1980s grown into one of the leading shipping companies within offshore oil loading. Another increasing focus for Knutsen O.A.S is the transport of natural gas. From 2004 to 2007, 5 LNG ships were delivered and this is a segment where the company has ambitions for further expansions.

Knutsen VOC technology 

This technology is a cost efficient method to reduce and limit VOC emissions during transport and loading of volatile cargoes such as crude oil. This technology limits the VOC emissions between 60 and 80% during transport and loading. In addition to reducing air emissions and, the Knutsen VOC technology reduces H2S emission from the cargo. This emission represents a hazard to the environment, the ship and also to the crews' health.

Pressurized natural gas transport

Pressurized natural gas (PNG) is a solution for maritime transport of natural gas. This technology has been developed in collaboration with Europipe GMBH (Germany) and Det Norske Veritas (Norway). In the start up of development, this technology encountered some problems due to previous pipeline regulations, but in 2003 when new regulation where in place the project got the go-ahead they needed.
 
This new technology opens for new transport alternatives especially suitable for offshore loading for direct transport to the market. These technology stores gas on board the ship in specially designed cylinders at a pressure of 250 barg. In comparison to LNG maritime transport, the gas treatment is minimal and comparable to treatment required for pipeline transport. The reduction in energy recourses required to compress the gas makes is a more environmental friendly solution than LNG.

References

External links 
http://www.Knutsenoas.com Knutsen OAS official web pages

Shipping companies of Norway
Tanker shipping companies
Transport companies established in 1895
Norwegian companies established in 1895